David Davidson (born November 17, 1986) is a Ghanaian footballer.

Career
After starting his career with Hearts of Oak in Ghana, Davidson went on trial with Fenerbache in 2006, eventually spending two-year with their second team. Davidson then played for KooTeePee and TP-47 in Finland before moving to Kazakhstan Premier League side FC Taraz during the summer of 2009. 
The following September, Davidson signed with Tajik League side Vakhsh Qurghonteppa. After his time in central Asia, Davidson played for semi-professional teams Roi Et United and Pattani in Thailand before signing with Philadelphia Fury of the American Soccer League at the start of 2016. The Philadelphia Fury was titled as the 2016 ASL Spring and Fall Champions.

References

External links
 FC KooTeePee Profile

1986 births
Living people
Ghanaian footballers
Ghanaian expatriate footballers
Tajikistan Higher League players
Veikkausliiga players
Accra Hearts of Oak S.C. players
FC Taraz players
Vakhsh Qurghonteppa players
FC KooTeePee players
TP-47 players
Expatriate footballers in Turkey
Expatriate footballers in Tajikistan
Expatriate footballers in Thailand
Expatriate footballers in Finland
Expatriate footballers in Kazakhstan
Expatriate soccer players in the United States
Association football midfielders